GSIA may refer to:

Global Sustainable Investment Alliance, an organization promoting sustainable investments
Graduate School of Industrial Administration, a business school of Carnegie Mellon University in Pittsburgh, Pennsylvania